Sunny Side Story is the second studio album from Japanese singer and voice actress Haruka Tomatsu, released on 16 January 2013. Two editions of the album were released: a standard version containing the music CD, and a special edition containing the CD as well as a DVD with bonus video clips.

Track listing

Bonus content

DVD edition
"Ashita Iro Himawari" Music Clip
Side Story of Sunny Side Story

External links
 Haruka Tomatsu official discography 

2013 albums
Haruka Tomatsu albums